In rugby union, the Tom French Cup is an honour awarded by New Zealand Rugby Union (NZRU) to the Tom French Memorial Māori player of the year. The cup has been awarded annually since 1949, when it was donated to the New Zealand Māori coach Tom French while the team was on tour in Australia. French had represented Buller provincially, and was selected for New Zealand Maori in 1911. After the First World War, where he lost an arm at Passchendaele, French continued his involvement in rugby by serving as both a selector and administrator. In 1957 he was made a life member of the NZRU.

The inaugural recipient in 1949 was Johnny Smith, who played for New Zealand's national team the All Blacks, and captained them in two Tests that year. Keith Davis was the Tom French Cup winner in 1952–54, and played extensively for both the All Blacks and New Zealand Māori; his time with the Māori included matches against both South Africa in 1956, and the British Lions in 1959. The record for cup wins is held by Sid Going, who played half-back for both New Zealand Māori and the All Blacks, and was awarded the cup six times; won consecutively between 1967 and 1972. Tane Norton won the cup in 1973 and 74, and went on to finish his playing career as All Black captain—his 27 international Test caps were earned consecutively. 1987 Rugby World Cup winner Buck Shelford was awarded the cup in 1985, and 1987–89; Shelford captained North Harbour, New Zealand Māori, and the All Blacks. During his 14 Tests as captain of the All Blacks the team never lost. When Shelford was eventually dropped from the All Blacks, he was replaced at number eight by fellow Tom French Cup recipient Zinzan Brooke. Brooke was awarded the cup in both 1992 and 1994, and also captained the Blues to the 1996 and 1997 Super 12 titles.

Carl Hayman was awarded the Tom French Cup in both 2004 and 2006, and was instrumental in helping New Zealand Māori defeat the British and Irish Lions for the first time in 2005. Hayman played 45 Test matches for the All Blacks. Fellow All Black Piri Weepu won the cup in both 2008 and 2011. In 2011 he was a member of the World Cup winning All Blacks side, and was named man of the match in New Zealand's quarter-final victory over Argentina.

Winners

References

Sources 

 
 
 
 
 
 
 
 
 
 

Māori All Blacks
Rugby union in New Zealand
Māori sport